Technological University (Maubin) ( is situated near Aung Heit village, Maubin Township, in Ayeyawady Region of Myanmar. It was first opened as Government Technical Institute (Maubin) on 3 November 1989. It was upgraded to Government Technological College on 31 May 2002, and to Technological University (Maubin) on 20 January 2007.

Structural Building 
There are 33 classrooms, one principal room, three management rooms, two stuff rooms, one convocation room, two practical science rooms, one language-lab room and three drawing rooms. There are three one-storey workshops that measure . There are ten unit one storey, brick nogging six unit one storey RC and two of six unit two of two storey RC.

Departments
Maubin TU is organized as follows:
 4 engineering departments
 5 academic departments

Engineering departments 
Maubin TU's engineering departments are as follows:
 Department of Civil Engineering
 Department of Mechanical Engineering
 Department of Electrical Power Engineering
 Department of Electronic Engineering

Academic departments 
The academic departments are:
 Department of Myanmar
 Department of Engineering Chemistry
 Department of English
 Department of Engineering Mathematics
 Department of Engineering Physics

Programs
 Bachelor of Engineering (B.E)

Degree offer

See also 
Technological University, Thanlyin
West Yangon Technological University
Mandalay Technological University

External links 

Technological universities in Myanmar